The men's javelin throw at the 1966 European Athletics Championships was held in Budapest, Hungary, at Népstadion on 1 and 2 September 1966.

Medalists

Results

Final
2 September

Qualification
1 September

Participation
According to an unofficial count, 23 athletes from 11 countries participated in the event.

 (2)
 (1)
 (3)
 (2)
 (3)
 (2)
 (2)
 (1)
 (3)
 (1)
 (3)

References

Javelin throw
Javelin throw at the European Athletics Championships